"Return Policy" is a song recorded by Canadian country music duo Autumn Hill for their second studio album, Anchor (2015). It was serviced to Canadian country radio on August 31, 2015 as the album's second official single after first being made available to digital retailers on June 8, 2015 as the album's third countdown single. The song was written by group members Tareya Green and Mike Robins along with Lindsay Rimes, and was produced by Rimes and David "Dwave" Thomson.

Content
"Return Policy" is a midtempo country pop and country rock song with a duration of three minutes and one second. It features a "sassy" lyric and a verbal back-and-forth between the two leads. The song's lyrics compare an ex-lover to a defective product for whom the narrator wishes he or she had a receipt and could return.

Track listing
Digital download – remix
 "Return Policy (Remix)" – 3:00

Music video
The accompanying video premiered through CMT on October 30, 2015 and features the duo performing on a makeshift stage on the back of a pickup truck as it drives through downtown Toronto at night. It was uploaded to the group' official YouTube channel on November 6, 2015.

Chart performance

Release history

References

2015 songs
2015 singles
Autumn Hill songs
Songs written by Lindsay Rimes